Tul is a Korean martial art form.

Tul or TUL may also refer to:
 Tul, Hormozgan, Iran
 Tuł, Masovian Voivodeship, Poland
 TUL corporation, a Taiwanese computer products manufacturer
 Technical University of Liberec, Czech Republic
 Lodz University of Technology (former name: Technical University of Lodz)
 Tradition und Leben, a German monarchist organisation
 Transnational University Limburg
 Tullus (praenomen), a Roman praenomen
 Tulsa International Airport, Oklahoma, United States
 Finnish Workers' Sports Federation, a Finnish amateur sports organisation
 Truck Utility Light, the British Army designation of the Land Rover Wolf 90